Graniger is a genus of beetles in the family Carabidae, containing the following species:

 Graniger cordicollis Audinet-Serville, 1821
 Graniger femoralis Coquerel, 1859

References

Harpalinae